Beudanticeras is an extinct cephalopod genus from the Late Cretaceous period; Albian and Cenomanian, belonging to the ammonoid subclass and included in the family Desmoceratidae.

Beudanticeras has a rather to very compressed shell that is moderately involute, with convex to flat sides and a narrowly arched out rim. Coiling is such that the outer whorl embraces much of the next inner whorl, leaving a small spiraled umbilicus. The shell is generally smooth but may have weak ribs but no tubercles. The suture is ammonitic.

The derivation of Beudanticeras may be from Uhligella, although Uhligella is partly contemporary with early Beudanticeras.  Other related genera include Beudantiella, Brewericeras, Zurcherella, and possibly Pseudosaynella.

Species 
The following species of Beudanticeras have been recognised:

 B. alamoense
 B. arduennense
 B. argonauticum
 B. beudanti
 B. flindersi
 B. hirtzi
 B. ingente
 B. komihevitraense
 B. mullerriedi
 B. robustum
 B. sutherlandi
 B. victoris

Distribution 
Fossils of Beudanticeras have been found in Angola, Antarctica, Argentina, Australia, Canada (British Columbia, Northwest Territories, Nunavut), Colombia (Hiló Formation, Tolima), the Dominican Republic, Egypt, France, Germany, Greenland, Iran, Madagascar, Mexico, Morocco, Mozambique, the Netherlands Antilles, Peru, the Russian Federation, South Africa, Switzerland, the United Kingdom, United States (Arizona, California) and Venezuela.

References

Further reading 
 Arkell et al., Mesozoic Ammonoidea; Treatise on Invertebrate Paleontology, Part L (Ammonoidea). Geol Soc of America and Univ Kansas Press.

Ammonitida genera
Desmoceratidae
Cretaceous ammonites
Ammonites of Africa
Cretaceous Africa
Ammonites of Europe
Cretaceous Europe
Ammonites of North America
Cretaceous Canada
Cretaceous Mexico
Cretaceous United States
Ammonites of South America
Cretaceous Argentina
Cretaceous Colombia
Cretaceous Peru
Cretaceous Venezuela
Albian life
Cenomanian life
Fossil taxa described in 1902
Albian genus extinctions